A forward operating site (FOS) or forward operating location (FOL) is a U.S. military term for facilities, defined as "a scalable, 'warm' facility that can support sustained operations, but with only a small permanent presence of support or contractor personnel as opposed to a FOB or MOB. A FOS will host occasional rotational forces and many contain pre-positioned equipment." These sites were established as the Pentagon began to address regional threats primarily in Africa and Latin America following its 2004 global posture review.

An FOS is differentiated from a cooperative security location (CSL) with no permanent force or contractor personnel, or a forward operating base (FOB) and main operating base (MOB), with a large force and a well-defended site.

Locations

They include, but are not limited to the following locations:

Asia
 Paya Lebar Airfield, Singapore

Caribbean
 Curaçao International Airport, Curaçao, Kingdom of the Netherlands
 Queen Beatrix International Airport, Aruba, Kingdom of the Netherlands

Central America
 Soto Cano AB, Honduras

Europe
 RAF Fairford, United Kingdom
 Bulgaria, see List of joint US-Bulgarian military bases
 Mihail Kogălniceanu International Airport, Romania

Africa
 Camp Lemonnier, Djibouti
 Morocco
 Tunisia

See also
 Loss of Strength Gradient
 Forward operating base (FOB)

References

Military installations